Head Waters (also Headwaters) is an unincorporated community in Highland County, Virginia, United States. The South Fork South Branch Potomac River rises north of Head Waters, hence the community's name. Head Waters has a post office with ZIP code 24442.

References

Unincorporated communities in Highland County, Virginia
Unincorporated communities in Virginia